VIA Motors is an American electric vehicle development and manufacturing company founded in 2010. VIA Motors started out converting GM vehicles into plug-in hybrids (PHEV), but now produces fully electric commercial vehicles for fleet managers. VIA is developing its own skateboard platform for Class 2-5 commercial vehicles, that will enter production in 2024. VIA sells directly to fleets and is taking orders now.

In August 2021, Ideanomics announced their intent to acquire VIA Motors for USD 630 million.

On January 26, 2023, Ideanomics announced that it had completed the acquisition of VIA Motors.

History
VIA Motors was spun off in November 2010 from Raser Technologies, the engineering company that, in 2009, showed a Hummer H3 said to be capable of returning 100 miles per gallon when fitted with Raser’s range-extender plug-in powertrain. Bob Lutz, former vice-chairman of GM credited as "Father of the Chevy Volt", featuring an extended-range electric powertrain called Voltec, joined as Chairman in 2011.

2010 – VIA Motors is formed from a private group of investors. Executives and engineers from General Motors and Raser Technologies join VIA Motors.

2011 – VIA raises $5.3 million from private investors including Carl Berg. Alpha and beta vehicles are delivered to PG&E. Bob Lutz joins VIA Motors as chairman.
2012 – VIA unveils a lineup of EREV versions of trucks, vans and SUVs at the North American International Auto Show in Detroit. VIA signs key suppliers, including Remy Motors and A123 Batteries. Fleet customers including Rocky Mountain Power and Verizon Wireless join vehicle testing program.

2019 – Robert (Bob) Purcell is appointed CEO of VIA Motors.

Electric Vehicles

VIA offers fully electric commercial vehicles in classes 3-5. Their skateboard-based vehicles will have multiple body styles available (cab chassis, flatbed, cargo van, step van, etc.) and are set to arrive in 2023. All of their vehicles are customized to what the route requires, using optimized engineering. VIA also offers refrigeration on their vehicles and integration with third-party autonomous driving services.

Optimized Engineering 
VIA claims to offer more affordable vehicles through what they call Optimized Engineering. They sit down with each customer and analyze the exact vehicle requirements the customer needs (route, climate, elevation gains, speed, average payload, etc.). VIA then works with the customer to create a fleet that matches those requirements. VIA's virtual testing environments allow them to do a majority of this testing virtually and cut down on research and development costs. This allows them to sell their vehicles at a reduced cost.

See also
 Bob Lutz

References

External links 
 

Electric vehicle manufacturers of the United States
Vehicle manufacturing companies established in 2010
Companies based in Orem, Utah
Manufacturing companies based in Utah
American companies established in 2010
2010 establishments in Utah
Privately held companies based in Utah